Aus heiterem Himmel (Out of the Blue) is a German comedy television series, broadcast between 1995 and 1999. The series was created by Hannah Hollinger and is about a comic author Tobias and his boat-building friend Christopher who inhabit an old villa and lead a life of promiscuity.

See also
List of German television series

External links
 

German comedy television series
1995 German television series debuts
1999 German television series endings
German-language television shows
Das Erste original programming